The Superior Court is Georgia's general jurisdiction trial court. It has exclusive, constitutional, authority over felony cases, divorce, equity and cases regarding title to land. The exclusive jurisdiction of this court also covers such matters as declaratory judgments, habeas corpus, mandamus, quo warranto and prohibition. The Superior Court corrects errors made by lower courts by issuing writs of certiorari; for some lower courts, the right to direct review by the Superior Court applies.

Organization
Superior Courts are organized into 10 Judicial Districts, comprising 50 judicial circuits. Each county has its own Superior Court, though a judge may serve more than one county. A chief judge handles the administrative tasks for each circuit.

Election of judges
Superior Court judges are elected to four-year terms in nonpartisan, circuit-wide races. To qualify as a Superior Court judge, a candidate must be at least 30 years old, a citizen of Georgia for at least three years, and have practiced law for at least seven years. Superior Court judges who have retired and taken senior status may hear cases in any circuit at the request of a local judge, an administrative judge, or the governor.

See also
Judiciary of Georgia (U.S. state)

References

External links 

 Official website for Georgia Superior Courts, retrieved November 20, 2020

Georgia (U.S. state) state courts
Georgia
Courts and tribunals with year of establishment missing